During the 1992 Summer Olympics in Barcelona, Spain, athletes from Yugoslavia and Macedonia competed as independent Olympic participants. Macedonian athletes could not appear under their own flag because their NOC had not been formed. Yugoslavia (also known as Serbia and Montenegro) was under United Nations sanctions which prevented the country from taking part in the Olympics. Individual Yugoslav athletes were allowed to take part as independent Olympic participants (and as Independent Paralympic participants at the 1992 Summer Paralympics).

58 competitors (52 from Yugoslavia, 6 from Republic of Macedonia), 39 men and 19 women, took part in 54 events in 13 sports. Three athletes won medals in 1992 as independent Olympic participants, all in shooting.

Medalists

Competitors
The following is the list of number of competitors in the Games.

Athletics

Men's 200 metres
 Dejan Jovković
 Qualification — 21.77 (→ did not advance)

Men's 400 metres
 Slobodan Branković
 Qualification — 46.34
 Quarter-Finals — 45.90 (→ did not advance)

Men's 800 metres
 Slobodan Popović
 Qualification — 1:49.69 (→ did not advance)

Men's High Jump
 Dragutin Topić
 Qualification — 2.26 m
 Final — 2.28 m (→ 8th place)

 Stevan Zorić
 Qualification — 2.15 m (→ did not advance)

Men's Shot Put
 Dragan Perić 
 Qualification — 20.24 m
 Final — 20.32 m (→ 7th place)

Women's 100 metres hurdles
 Elizabeta Pavlovska
 Qualifying Heat — 14.26 (→ did not advance)

Women's 10,000 metres
 Suzana Ćirić
 Qualifying Heat — 33:42.26 (→ did not advance)

Women's Long Jump
 Tamara Malešev 
 Qualification — 6.35 m (→ did not advance)

Canoeing

Men's Kayak Singles, 500 metres
 Žarko Vekić
Qualifying Heat — 1:51.44
Repechages - 1:55.32 (→ did not advance)

Men's Kayak Singles, 1,000 metres
 Srđan Marilović
Qualifying Heat — 3:50.02
Repechages - 3:45.52 (→ did not advance)

Men's Kayak Doubles, 1,000 metres
 Srđan Marilović and  Žarko Vekić
Qualifying Heat — 3:31.69
Repechages - 3:38.17 (→ did not advance)

Men's Kayak Singles, Slalom
 Lazar Popovski
123.82 (Run 1: 2:03.82, 0 points, Run 2: 2:05.72, 10 points, 34th place)
 Milan Đorđević
156.28 (Run 1: DNF, 0 points, Run 2: 2:26.28, 10 points, 39th place)

Men's Canadian Singles, Slalom
 Lazo Miloević
170.22 (Run 1: Did not finish, 55 points, Run 2: 2:35.22, 15 points, 31st place)

Cycling

Five male cyclists competed as independent Olympic participants in 1992.

Men's road race
 Aleksandar Milenković — +0:35 (→ 42nd place)
 Radiša Čubrić — +9:53 (→ 78th place)
 Mikoš Rnjaković — Didn't finish

Men's team time trial
 Mićo Brković,  Aleksandar Milenković,  Mikoš Rnjaković,  Dušan Popeskov
2:14:37 → 18th place

Men's points race
  Dušan Popeskov
Round 1 — Didn't finish

Fencing

One female fencer competed as an independent Olympic participant in 1992.

Women's foil
 Tamara Savić-Šotra → 31st place

Judo

Men's Lightweight
 Miroslav Jočić

Men's Half-Heavyweight
 Dano Pantić

Men's Heavyweight
 Mitar Milinković

Women's Extra-Lightweight
 Leposava Marković

Rhythmic gymnastics

Women's Individual
 Majda Milak
 Qualification — 35.675 points (Hoop - 9.100 points, Rope - 9.000 points, Clubs - 8.600 points, Ball  - 8.975 points) (32nd overall, did not advance)

 Kristina Radonjić
 Qualification — 35.600 points (Hoop - 9.000 points, Rope - 8.700 points, Clubs - 8.800 points, Ball  - 9.100 points) (33rd overall, did not advance)

Rowing

Men's Coxless Pairs
 Vladimir Banjanac and  Lazo Pivač
Heat: 7:08.35 (5th in heat 1, advanced to repechage)
Repechage: 6:54.76 (3rd in repechage, advanced to final C) 
Final C: 6:44.52 (2nd in final C, 14th overall)

Shooting

Men's 10m Air Rifle
  Goran Maksimović
Qualification: 592 points (2nd overall, Qualified)
Final: 98.6 points (Total: 690.6) → 5th place

  Nemanja Mirosavljev
Qualification: 587 points (18th overall, did not advance)

Men's 50m Rifle Prone
  Stevan Pletikosić
Qualification: 597 points (3rd overall, Qualified)
Final: 104.1 points (Total: 701.1) →  Bronze Medal

  Goran Maksimović
Qualification: 591 points (31st overall, did not advance)

Men's 50m Rifle 3 Positions
  Nemanja Mirosavljev
Qualification: 1163 points (Prone: 397 points, Standing: 374 points, Kneeling: 392 points) (9th overall, did not advance)

  Goran Maksimović
Qualification: 1158 points (Prone: 396 points, Standing: 379 points, Kneeling: 383 points) (17th overall, did not advance)

Women's 10m Air Rifle
  Aranka Binder
Qualification: 393 points (5th overall, Qualified)
Final: 102.1 points (Total: 495.1) →  Bronze Medal

  Lidija Mihajlović
Qualification: 389 points (17th overall, did not advance)

Women's 50m Rifle 3 Positions
  Aleksandra Ivošev
Qualification: 577 points (Prone: 198 points, Standing: 198 points, Kneeling: 190 points) (14th overall, did not advance)

  Lidija Mihajlović
Qualification: 565 points (Prone: 192 points, Standing: 182 points, Kneeling: 191 points) (33rd overall, did not advance)

Women's 10m Air Pistol
  Jasna Šekarić
Qualification: 389 points (1st overall, Qualified)
 Final: 97.4 points (Total: 486.4) →  Silver Medal

  Eszter Poljak
Qualification: 369 points (42nd overall, did not advance)

Women's 25m Pistol
  Jasna Šekarić
Qualification: 583 points (5th overall, Qualified)
Final: 93 points (Total: 676) → 6th

Swimming

Men's 50 metre freestyle
 Mladen Kapor
 Qualifying Heat — 23.42 (→ did not advance)

Men's 100 metre freestyle
 Mladen Kapor
 Qualifying Heat — 51.44 (→ did not advance)

Men's 100 metre butterfly
 Kire Filipovski
 Qualifying Heat — 56.68 (→ did not advance)

Men's 200 metre butterfly
 Kire Filipovski
 Qualifying Heat — 2:08.71 (→ did not advance)

Women's 100 metre backstroke
 Darija Alauf
 Qualifying Heat — 1:06.81 (→ did not advance)

Women's 200 metre backstroke
 Darija Alauf
 Qualifying Heat — 2:22.07 (→ did not advance)

Women's 100 metre butterfly
 Nataša Meškovska
 Qualifying Heat — 1:04.16 (→ did not advance)

Women's 200 metre butterfly
 Nataša Meškovska
 Qualifying Heat — 2:16.54 (→ did not advance)

Synchronized swimming

Three synchronized swimmers competed as independent Olympic participants in 1992.

Women's solo
 Marija Senica
 Maja Kos
 Vanja Mičeta

Women's duet
 Maja Kos
 Vanja Mičeta

Table tennis

  Ilija Lupulesku
  Zoran Kalinić
  Slobodan Grujić
  Jasna Fazlić-Reed
  Gordana Perkučin

Tennis

Men

Wrestling

Men's freestyle 57 kg
 Zoran Šorov
Pool A
Lost to Jürgen Scheibe (GER) (2-6)
Lost to Rumen Pavlov (BUL) by fall
7th in pool, did not advance

Men's Greco-Roman
 Senad Rizvanović
 Zoran Galović
 Nandor Sabo
 Željko Trajković
 Goran Kasum
 Pajo Ivošević
 Miloš Govedarica
 Milan Radaković

See also
 Independent Paralympic participants at the 1992 Summer Paralympics

Notes

References

External links
 
 
 

Nations at the 1992 Summer Olympics
1992, Independent
1992, Independent
1992, Independent
1992 in Yugoslav sport
1992